Rowdy Inspector is a 1992 Telugu-language action film produced by T. Trivikrama Rao under the Vijayalakshmi Art Pictures banner and directed by B. Gopal. It stars Nandamuri Balakrishna and Vijayashanti, with music composed by Bappi Lahiri. The film was dubbed in Tamil as Auto Rani with a comedy subplot involving Senthil.

Plot 
Inspector Ramaraju is a sincere police officer, that people call a Rowdy Inspector, which is his titular role. Auto Rani is an auto driver who falls in love with Ramaraju and helps him out with his missions. He arrests every goon that he sees. Bobarlanka Ramabrahmam is an underworld don who rules areas filled with rowdies. Home Minister Karanam Kaasiah and the SP are his supporters. Ramabrahmam tries to show Ramaraju who's boss for messing with his gang of goons. Ramabrahmam sends his goons who stab Ramaraju's grandmother as Ramaraju beats them up and luckily saves her with the help of his younger brother Gandhi's college lecturer.

After some time, Ramaraju arrests Ramabrahmam's brother Narasimham and Rakhi a local crook for killing a female constable Kanaka. Ramabrahmam sends his goons who free his brother and Rakhi. When Ramaraju tries to shoot Rakhi, Rakhi makes him accidentally shoots a college lecturer who saved his grandmother as Rakhi manages to escape from him. The lecturer's family thinks of Ramaraju as a criminal. Ramaraju tries to tell them it was an accident and thinks of him as their son. But the lecturer's mother Parvathamma scolds him and kicks him out of their house. One day Ramabrahmam sends his goons to attack the lecturer's family and convince Gandhi to make Ramaraju get suspended from the police department. Ramaraju saves the family as the goons surrender and tells Gandhi that this was all a scheme to get Ramaraju suspended, not for the sadness of their lecturer's death. Parvathamma forgives Ramaraju and considers him her son. He gets D.I.G. Jagannath Rao's son married to Parvathamma's daughter Girija.

Meanwhile, Rakhi calls Narasimham and reveals where he is. But Ramabrahmam wants Rakhi killed, worried that he could be in danger. They send a lorry but kill an innocent man, not Rakhi. One day Ramaraju gets informed by L.K. Balu that Rakhi has been found and he just gave him a lift in his auto to his apartment. Ramaraju goes to the apartment complex Rakhi is in and finds him. When he's about to arrest him, S.P. comes and shoots Rakhi to death. Ramaraju, enraged, fights with the S.P. Later on, Ramabrahamam kills D.I.G. to tell in court that Ramaraju is the killer. Home Minister and S.P. are witnesses and even though they witnessed D.I.G.'s murder, they declare that it was Ramaraju who killed him. Home Minister promotes S.P. as the new D.I.G. but no one follows his orders because they know Ramabrahmam's the killer. Rani and Gandhi have all the evidence in proving that Ramabrahmam is guilty until Gandhi is kidnapped by Koti, a thug who works for Ramabrahmam. Rani beats up Koti and saves Gandhi. Meanwhile, in court, the Home Minister is forced by the other officers to admit that Ramabrahmam killed D.I.G. as he comes to the court and kills the Home Minister. Ramaraju, Rani, and everyone else in a court fight with Ramabrahmam and his men. The film ends with Ramaraju proving that Ramabrahmam is guilty and finally arrests him and his brother.

Cast 

Nandamuri Balakrishna as Inspector Ramaraju
Vijayashanti as Auto Rani
Jaggayya as D.I.G. Jaganath Rao
Captain Raju as S.P.
Mohan Raj as Bobarlanka Ramabrahmam
Kota Srinivasa Rao as Home Minister Karanam Kaasiah
Brahmanandam as L. K. Balu
Ali as Gotham
Nutan Prasad as Judge
Saikumar as Narasimham
Srihari as Koti
Rakhi as Rakhi
Harish as Gandhi
Vijaya Rangaraju as Drunker
Arun Kumar as Master
Annapurna as Parvathamma
Kineera as Constable Kanaka
Pakija as Appadala Appamma
Sairadha as Aasha
Madhurima as Girija
Hema as Jyothi
Nirmalamma as Ramaraju's grandmother

Soundtrack 
Music composed by Bappi Lahiri. Lyrics written by Bhuvanachandra. Music released on Lahari Music Company. The song "Are O Sambha" was recreated for Pataas (2015) by Sai Karthik.

References

External links 

1990s Telugu-language films
1992 action films
1992 films
Fictional portrayals of the Andhra Pradesh Police
Films directed by B. Gopal
Films scored by Bappi Lahiri
Indian action films